Daniel Caprice (born 20 October 1989 in Chatham, Kent) is a former Rugby Union player who last played as Wing and fullback for London Welsh in the Aviva Premiership.

Dan began playing rugby aged 8 at Medway Rugby Club, Rochester. He moved on to Maidstone RFC aged 10, where he played as Wing. Dan left Chatham Grammar School for Boys in 2006 to take up the Findlay Sports Scholarship at Sevenoaks School in Kent.

Dan left Sevenoaks School with an International Baccalaureate Diploma. He trained full-time with the Saracens Academy.

Dan Caprice scored for Saracens in their draw against the British Army. Caprice also helped Saracens claim their first trophy in the Plate competition of the Middlesex Sevens. Caprice scored 3 tries in Blackheath's 85–24 win over Waterloo.

On 23 June 2011, Caprice signed for French Top 14 side Biarritz Olympique.

Caprice left Biarritz in the last year of his contract and moved to New Zealand in 2012 where he signed with ITM Cup side Northland.

He returned to the UK in November 2012 and joined London Welsh.

In 2016, Caprice trialed with Bradford Bulls before desperately entering as a contestant on 9Go! reality TV show The NRL Rookie to attempt to win an NRL contract. He failed after just two weeks.

References

External links

 Image at gettyimages
 IRB Hong Kong Sevens 2009
 RFU England Sevens Profile
 

1989 births
Living people
Biarritz Olympique players
Commonwealth Games rugby sevens players of England
English rugby union players
London Welsh RFC players
Male rugby sevens players
Participants in Australian reality television series
People educated at Sevenoaks School
Rugby sevens players at the 2010 Commonwealth Games
Rugby union players from Chatham, Kent